O Passo do Lui (Portuguese for Lui's Step) is the second studio album by Brazilian rock band Os Paralamas do Sucesso. Released in 1984, it was the album that cemented Paralamas' popularity all over Brazil, with hits such as "Ska", "Meu Erro", "Me Liga" and "Romance Ideal". The album's name is a homage to Lui, a friend of Paralamas who, according to them, is a good dancer. Lui is also depicted on the front cover.

Track listing
Side One

Side Two

Personnel

Os Paralamas do Sucesso 
 Bi Ribeiro (credited as Felipe Bi Ribeiro) — bass
 Herbert Vianna — guitar, vocals
 João Barone — drums, percussion

Additional musicians 
 Lulu Santos — backing vocals on "Assaltaram a Gramática"
 Scarlet Moon — backing vocals on "Assaltaram a Gramática"
 Jotinha - Keyboards on "Me Liga", "Óculos" and "Meu Erro"
 Ricardo Cristaldi - Keyboards on "Óculos" and "Assaltaram a Gramática".
 Paula Preuss - Backing vocals in "Me Liga" and "Fui Eu"
 Léo Gandelmann - Saxophone

Additional personnel 
 Production manager - Mayrton Bahia
 Production assistant - Franklin Garrido
 Recording technicians - Franklin Garrido, Renato Luiz and José Celso
 Mixing technicians - Marcelo Sussekind and Franklin Garrido
 Studio auxiliary - Rob and Geraldo
 Cut - Osmar Furtado
 Cover art - Ricardo Leite
 Pictures - Maurício Valladares
 Graphic coordination - Gustavo Caio

References

1984 albums
Os Paralamas do Sucesso albums
EMI Records albums